The 2000 United States Senate election in Ohio took place on November 7, 2000. Incumbent Republican U.S. Senator Mike DeWine won re-election to a second term. DeWine's victory made him the first Republican re-elected to the Senate in Ohio since John W. Bricker in 1952. As of 2022, this remains the last time that the Republicans have won Ohio’s class 1 Senate seat.

Republican primary

Candidates 
 Frank Cremeans, former U.S. Representative
 Mike DeWine, incumbent U.S. Senator
 Ronald Richard Dickson, gun show prompter

Result

Democratic primary

Candidates 
 Ted Celeste, real estate developer and brother of former Ohio Governor Dick Celeste
 Richard Cordray, former Solicitor General of Ohio and nominee for Ohio Attorney General in 1998
 Marvin McMickle, Reverend
 Dan Radakovich, activist

Results

General election

Debates
Complete video of debate, November 4, 2000

Results

See also 
 2000 United States Senate elections

References 

Ohio
2000
2000 Ohio elections